Przemyśl is a place name found in Poland, based on the male name Przemysł. For the male name see Przemysł (name), Přemysl and Przemysław.
 Przemyśl, a city in south-east Poland, probably established by an unknown duke called Przemysł
 Przemyśl Voivodeship, a Polish province from 1975 to 1998
 Przemyśl, Greater Poland Voivodeship (west-central Poland)

Battles
 Siege of Przemyśl, an important battle of the First World War

See also